The Fashion Show is a British television programme which debuted on ITV2 on 11 September 2008. The programme was originally titled The Fashion Project.

The show originally aired at 8pm on ITV2 as part of XXL Thursday, the show was moved to an earlier 7pm slot for episodes 4–8 to accommodate CelebAir which was moved due to poor ratings, the show returned to its original 8pm slot for the final 2 episodes.

References

External links

The Fashion Show With Abbey Clancy Coming To ITV2 Unreality Primetime (27 August 2008)

2008 British television series debuts
Fashion-themed television series
ITV (TV network) original programming
2008 British television series endings